1926 Simko Shikak revolt refers to a short-timed Kurdish uprising against the Pahlavi dynasty of Iran in 1926, led by Kurdish chieftain Simko Shikak from Shikak tribe.

Background
In 1919 Simko Shikak has started his first and foreign-backed revolt against Iranian government. His expeditions resulted with regional plunder and massacres of Assyrians, Alevis and even Kurdish tribes. After three years of revolt he was defeated, but in 1924 Reza Khan pardoned him and he returned to Iran from exile. When Reza Khan had become Reza Shah in 1925, Simko pledged eternal loyalty to him and Iranian state. However, next year Simko allied himself with Haji Agha of Herki and tribal chiefs of Begzadeh, regained control of his tribe and begun another rebellion.

Revolt

Short military confrontation has started in October 1926 in Salmas (a.k.a. Dilman or Shahpur) where rebels started encircling the city. Shortly after, Iranian forces were dispatched from Urmia, Sharafkhaneh and Khoy, engaged rebels and defeated them. During engagement half of Simko's Shikak troops defected to the tribe’s previous leader and Simko himself fled to Mandatory Iraq.

Aftermath

In 1926, another unrelated Kurdish tribal revolt occurred in Kurdistan Province. Kurdish insurgency and seasonal migrations in late 1920s, along with long-running tensions between Tehran and Ankara, resulted in border clashes and even military penetrations in both Iranian and Turkish territory. In 1930, the commander of Iranian Army General Hassan Muqaddam sent a letter to Simko, who was residing in the village of Barzan, and invited him for a meeting in the town of Oshnaviyeh. After consulting with his friends, Simko along with Khorshid Agha Harki went to Oshnaviyeh and were invited to the house of local army commander, Colonel Norouzi and were told to wait for the Iranian general. Colonel Norouzi convinced Simko to go to the outskirts of the town to welcome the general's arrival. However, this was a trap and Simko was ambushed and killed on the evening of June 30, 1930.

Simko's revolts are considered as attempt by a powerful tribal chief to establish his personal authority vis-à-vis the central government throughout the region. Although elements of Kurdish nationalism were present in this movement, historians agree these were hardly articulate enough to justify a claim that recognition of Kurdish identity was a major issue in Simko's movement. It lacked any kind of administrative organization and Simko was primary interested in plunder. Government forces and non-Kurds were not the only ones to suffer in the attacks, the Kurdish population was also robbed and assaulted. Simko's men do not appear to have felt any sense of unity or solidarity with fellow Kurds. On other hand, Reza Shah's military victory over Simko and Turkic tribal leaders initiated with repressive era toward non-Iranian minorities.

See also
Timeline of Kurdish uprisings
List of modern conflicts in the Middle East

References

Rebellions in Iran
1920s in Iran
Conflicts in 1926
Kurdish rebellions in Iran
Kurdish rebellions